The Phoenix freeway shootings, also known as the I-10 shootings, were a series of eleven incidents that occurred between August 27 and September 10, 2015, along Interstate 10 and State Route 202 in Phoenix, Arizona.  Each incident resulted in projectile damage to cars, and one girl was injured.

A suspect was arrested on September 18, but charges against him were dropped in April 2016.

Events
Beginning on August 27, eleven shootings occurred: eight by bullets and three by unspecified projectiles.  Ten of the incidents occurred on Interstate 10, while the eleventh was on State Route 202.  The final shooting occurred on September 10.

False leads
On September 11, a man and woman driving a car were taken into custody in relation to the shootings. The woman was later released, but the 19-year-old male suspect was kept in police custody, as sources stated that he boasted about the shootings to friends. He was later arrested on an unrelated marijuana charge.

Road debris shattering windows also played a role in the investigation, as shattered windows were often investigated as being part of the spree. For example, on September 16 a driver reported his windows being shot by a car that he was seeking to pass, but police later stated that road debris caused the window damage.

Three 18-year-olds with a slingshot were arrested on September 13 on claims that they had been making copycat attacks, and the three admitted to targeting cars and pedestrians. They were later released.

Mistaken Suspect
Leslie Allen Merritt, Jr., then aged 21, was arrested in Glendale on September 18, 2015.  Police initially claimed that Merritt held anti-government and anti-police views.  One day after his arrest, police claimed that they had linked the first four shootings to a pistol owned by Merritt. The weapon in question was later shown to have been in a pawn shop at the time of the fourth shooting.  He was charged with fifteen felony counts, including carrying out a drive-by shooting, aggravated assault, unlawfully discharging a firearm, disorderly conduct, and endangerment; prosecutors also considered filing terrorism charges, but ultimately did not, as terrorism-related laws focused primarily on protecting public utilities and did not encompass freeway shootings.

All charges were dropped in April 2016. Merritt was formally cleared of all charges and records were sealed in an August 2020 proceeding with Maricopa County Superior Court Judge William Wingard presiding, who stated "Leslie Allen Merritt Jr. has been cleared of any allegation or charge, and such a finding is in the interest of justice."

Merritt filed a lawsuit against state officials, which went to jury trial in the fall of 2020. The jury returned a finding for the defense, which Merritt appealed in April 2021. The appeal was denied by the  Arizona District Court. Merritt ultimately received a $100,000 settlement concluding the countersuit.

See also
 Serial Shooter, a similar crime spree that occurred from 2005 to 2006 in the Phoenix area
 Ohio highway sniper attacks, a similar crime spree that occurred in 2003 along Interstate 270 in Ohio
 Maryvale serial shooter, a similar crime spree that occurred in 2016 in Phoenix, mainly the Maryvale neighborhood.

References

Interstate 10
2010s in Phoenix, Arizona
2015 in Arizona
Crime in Arizona
Attacks in the United States in 2015
August 2015 crimes in the United States
September 2015 crimes in the United States
Unidentified American criminals